Monomania is the sixth studio album by American indie rock band Deerhunter, released on May 7, 2013 on 4AD. Produced by both the band and Nicolas Vernhes, the album is the first to feature bassist Josh McKay, and is the only studio album to feature guitarist Frankie Broyles.

The album received universal acclaim upon its release. Monomania reached number seventy-three on the UK Albums Chart.

Background
The album's title is a reference to lead singer Bradford Cox’s obsessive traits. In 2015, Cox reflected on his life while writing, recording and promoting Monomania, stating: I was actually going through a deep period of passionate rage. [...] That was what I was like at that time: a mixed-up wreck. Monomania was a very hateful record, and I mistreated a lot of people around me. I was in a lot of pain and very lonely. But there was also a big sense of humor; I never lose my sense of humor."

Recording and release
The album was recorded at Rare Book Room Studio in Brooklyn, with producer Nicolas Vernhes, who also produced Microcastle and Rainwater Cassette Exchange.

The album's title is a reference to lead singer Bradford Cox’s obsessive traits. According to Lockett Pundt and Cox, Pierre Schaeffer, Steve Reich, and Bo Diddley were major influences on the album, along with the artists such as Ramones and Ricky Nelson. Bradford Cox noted, "I can't hold a match to that stuff and I never will. I'll never be black, I'll never have that experience. That's what's missing from indie culture, though: Bo Diddley and blackness. There's a struggle that exists in black music and hillbilly music from a certain era. Old music resonates with me, new music doesn't." Cox also described the album as "a very avant-garde rock & roll record".

In 2015, Cox reflected on Monomania and its reception: "I really think Monomania was a successful record artistically, and I don’t think people view it that way. I think it’s viewed as an exhausted misstep. Frankly, I feel a lot stronger about Monomania [than 2015's Fading Frontier]. Monomania was a case where I set out to accomplish, and I was able to execute, very much what I wanted to. In that way it was a success. I don’t give a shit how many copies it sold or how it got reviewed."

Reception

Critical
Monomania received positive reviews from critics upon its release. At Metacritic, which assigns a normalized rating out of 100 to reviews from mainstream critics, the album has received an average score of 81, based on 41 reviews, indicating "universal acclaim".

Ian Cohen of Pitchfork gave the album a "Best New Music" designation, writing "Monomania is certainly a strong effort on its own merits, and more importantly, they’ve avoided making their deflating "diminishing returns" record [..] that casts doubts about whether they’ve gone too far down the same path. They’ve pulled off something admirable in making an illogical left turn feel like the logical next step where one didn’t exist." Spins Marc Hogan also praised the album, writing "An impishly brilliant 12-song set of scruffy garage rock with moments of dreamy shimmer, Monomania leaves no confusion about what sort of band Deerhunter are: one that won't stoop to conquer."

Slant Magazines Kevin Liedel, on the other hand, gave the album a mixed review, writing "A catalogue of trailing ellipses and blank thought balloons, the album is hardly characteristic of the band's fastidious mien. Whereas both Deerhunter and Atlas Sound albums typically reflect the obsessive brilliance and meticulous pathos of Cox's personality, there's few signs of either on Monomania, which is in dire need of a little less impulse and a bit more OCD."

Commercial
The album debuted at  No. 41 on the Billboard 200 albums chart on its release, selling around 10,000 copies in the United States in its first week. It also debuted at No. 12 on Billboard's Top Rock Albums,  and No. 10 on the Alternative Albums chart. The album has sold 33,000 copies in the United States as of October 2015.

Track listing

Personnel

Deerhunter
Bradford Cox – vocals (1–2, 4–12), percussion (3, 5, 6, 7, 9, 10), tapes (1, 2, 6,   10), acoustic guitar (1, 6, 11), electric rhythm guitar (4, 12), guitar (5), electric melody bass (12), synthesizer (3), organ (5), gamelan (2), treatments (3), little instruments (5), fog machine (1), metal box (9)
Lockett Pundt – electric rhythm guitar (1, 2, 3, 5, 6, 8), electric lead guitar (3, 4, 9, 10), lead vocals (3), octave lead guitar (2), low guitar (7) acoustic guitar (9, 12), percussion (5), field recording (10)
Moses Archuleta – drums, percussion (1), videos (1), auxiliary hi-hat (3)
Frankie Broyles – electric lead guitar (1, 2, 5, 6, 8), electric guitar (3), electric rhythm guitar (9, 10), steel guitar (4), high guitar (7), acoustic guitar (12), field recording (10)
Josh McKay – bass guitar, farfisa (9), Wurlitzer (9), Baldwin organ (9)

Recording personnel
Nicolas Vernhes – producer, recording
Deerhunter – producer
Bradford Cox – recording
Gabe Wax – assistant engineer
Joe Lambert – mastering

Artwork
Winston Parker – "Neon Calligraphy"
Robert Semmer – photography
Proenza Schouler – clothing and direction
Matt de Jong – art direction
Bradford Cox – art direction

Chart positions

References

External links
 "Deerhunter" on 4AD Records

2013 albums
Deerhunter albums
4AD albums